is the J-pop duo Rythem's fifth single. It was released on May 26, 2004 under Sony Music Entertainment Japan label. The title track was used as the theme song for Nippon Television's drama entitled Hikari to Tomo ni... ~Jiheishouji wo Kakaete~. This single was able to reach the #12 spot in the Oricon weekly making it Rythem's second most successful single to date.

The item's stock number is AICL-1534.

Track listing
Mangekyō Kirakira
Composition/Lyrics: Rythem
Arrangement: CHOKKAKU
Rapunzel
Composition/Lyrics: Rythem
Arrangement: CHOKKAKU
Mangekyō Kirakira (instrumental)
Rapunzel (instrumental)

2004 singles
Rythem songs
2004 songs
Sony Music Entertainment Japan singles